Higher is a 2003 album by the Canadian hard rock band Harem Scarem.

Track listing

Band members
Harry Hess - lead vocals, guitar, producer
Pete Lesperance - lead guitar, backing vocals
Barry Donaghy - bass, backing vocals
Creighton Doane - drums, backing vocals

References 

2003 albums
Harem Scarem albums
Frontiers Records albums